John Knox Christian School (JKCS) is a Christian independent K-12 school in Burnaby, British Columbia.

Overview
John Knox Christian School has been providing Christian education in Burnaby since 1955. In 2018, John Knox started a high school, temporarily located at 7650 Sapperton Avenue, Burnaby. A new secondary campus was under construction at 260-12th Street, New Westminster. It opened in September 2019. All curriculum at John Knox is approved by the British Columbia Ministry of Education and is taught from a Christian perspective. It has a Fraser Institute rating of 9.5 out of 10 in 2019, ranking it 31st, and has 5 year average of 9.28 out of 10.

History
In 1955, the school was founded by the New West Christian Reformed Church, a group of Dutch immigrants. It originally accommodated 65 K-7 students, 2 teachers, and a principal. The next year 103 students were enrolled. There have been multiple expansions to the elementary campus over the years, and in 2005 Carver Christian School was opened in partnership with Vancouver Christian School. In 2018, John Knox built their own highschool located at 260 12th Street.

References

External links
John Knox Christian School's Official Website

Elementary schools in British Columbia
Education in Burnaby
High schools in British Columbia
High schools in Burnaby
Private schools in British Columbia